Events from the year 1461 in Ireland.

Incumbent
Lord: Henry VI (until 4 March), then Edward IV

Events

Births

Deaths
May 1 – James Butler, 5th Earl of Ormonde, Lord Lieutenant (b. 1420)

 
1460s in Ireland
Ireland
Years of the 15th century in Ireland